Brandon Jackson may refer to:
Brandon Jackson (American football) (born 1985), American football running back
Brandon Jackson (priest) (1934–2023), British Anglican priest, Dean of Lincoln
Brandon T. Jackson (born 1984), American actor/comedian

See also
Branden Jackson (born 1992), American football defensive end
Brendan Jackson (1935–1998), Royal Air Force officer